Doris Bensimon (also known as, Doris Bensimon-Donath; 1924 – 8 December 2009) was an Austrian-born French sociologist and academic whose research focused on the study of contemporary Judaism. She taught at the University of Caen and Institut national des langues et civilisations orientales (INALCO).

Early life and education
Doris Donath was born in 1924 in Vienna, Austria. Her father was Robert Donath (born 12 June 1883, Vienna). After the Anschluss, the Donath family left Austria and removed to Antwerp, before coming to Lille, France, where it was protected by the Préfet du Nord. On 11 September 1942 Robert was deported by Convoy No. 31 to Auschwitz via Drancy internment camp, where he was killed, at age 59. With her mother, Bensimon took refuge in Lyon. 

Bensimon received a State doctorate.

Career
Bensimon became a researcher at the Centre national de la recherche scientifique (CNRS) where she was responsible for the team working on the sociology of Judaism, within the Groupe de Sociologie des Religions ("Sociology Group of Religions"). She also became a professor at the University of Caen and at INALCO in Paris.

Personal life
Bensimon died on 8 December 2009 in the 9th arrondissement of Paris. She is buried next to her husband, in the Cimetière parisien de Pantin.

Selected works 
 L'évolution de la femme israelite à Fès, 1962
 Évolution du judaïsme marocain sous le protectorat français, 1912-1956, 1968
 Immigrants d'Afrique du Nord en Israël : évolution et adaptation, 1970
 Follow-up des anciens élèves des écoles juives à plein temps : rapport d'enquête, 1971
 L'intégration des juifs nord-africains en France, 1971
 Social integration of North African Jews in Israel, 1973
 Les mariages mixtes., 1975
 Judaïcité parisienne et migrations à la fin du XIXe et au début du XXe siècle., 1975
 Education en Israel., 1976
 Un mariage : deux traditions, 1977
 Israel et ses populations, 1977
 Communautés juives (1880-1978) : sources et méthodes de recherches, 1978
 Socio-démographie des juifs de France et d'Algérie, 1867-1907, 1976
 L'Irruption de l'Occident : les Juifs du Maroc., 1982
 Mondeville : Changement social et vie quotidienne dans une banlieue ouvrière, 1983
 La population juive de France : socio-démographie et identité, 1984 (with Sergio Della Pergola)  
 Les Grandes rafles : juifs en France, 1940-1944, 1987
 The teaching of Jewish civilization at European universities : report with maps and an inventory of institutions, 1988
 Identité et acculturation, 1988
 Israéliens : des juifs et des arabes, 1989
 Judaïsme, sciences et techniques : actes du colloque, 1989
 Les Juifs d’Algérie. Mémoires et identités plurielles, 1989 (with Joëlle Allouche-Benayoun)
 Les Juifs de France et leurs relations avec Israël (1945-1988), 1989
 Science et technologie en Israël, 1990
 Religion et état en Israel, 1992
 Les juifs dans le monde au tournant du XXIe siècle, 1994
 Israéliens et Palestiniens : la longue marche vers la paix, 1995
 Juifs d'Europe centrale et orientale, 1945-1996, 1997
 Israele e la diaspora : gli ebrei nel mondo, 1999
 Adolph Donath : 1876-1937 : parcours d'un intellectuel juif germanophone : Vienne, Berlin, Prague, 2000
 Migrations juives en Diaspora après 1945,2001
 Juifs en Allemagne aujourd'hui, 2004
 Quotidien du vingtième siècle : histoire d'une vie mouvementée, 2007

Notes

References

Bibliography
 

1924 births
2009 deaths
Jewish emigrants from Austria after the Anschluss
French sociologists
Jewish sociologists
Austrian Jews
Academic staff of the University of Caen Normandy
Sociologists of religion
French women sociologists
French National Centre for Scientific Research
Austrian emigrants to France
20th-century French women writers
21st-century French women writers